Alberto Paris (born 5 April 1965) is an Italian former professional tennis player.

Biography
Born in Brescia, Paris toured professionally in the 1980s and reached a best singles ranking of 207 in the world. 

Paris featured on three occasions in the qualifiers for Wimbledon and made his only Grand Prix main draw appearance at the 1987 Tel Aviv Open, where he was beaten in the first round by Jimmy Connors.

As a doubles player on the professional tour he had a top ranking of 159 and won a Challenger tournament in Istanbul in 1987.

Paris was based during his career in Luxembourg and while coaching there in the 1990s appeared in 10 Davis Cup ties for the country. His best format in Davis Cup was doubles, earning a 7/2 record when he teamed up with regular partner Johnny Goudenbour.

Challenger titles

Doubles: (1)

References

External links
 
 
 

1965 births
Living people
Italian male tennis players
Luxembourgian male tennis players
Italian emigrants to Luxembourg
Sportspeople from Brescia